Aspach is the name or part of the name of several places:

 Aspach, Baden-Württemberg, Germany
 Aspach, Thuringia, Germany
 Aspach, Upper Austria, Austria
 Aspach, Moselle, in the Moselle département, France
 Aspach, Haut-Rhin, in the Haut-Rhin département, France
 Aspach-le-Bas, in the Haut-Rhin département
 Aspach-le-Haut, in the Haut-Rhin département

See also
 Asbach